The Indian Harbor Yacht Club is a U.S. boating organization, based at 710 Steamboat Road in Greenwich, CT, with access to Long Island Sound. The club, founded in 1889 in New York City, is based mainly around personally owned yachts and pleasure boats, but also has a long history of competitive races. The New York Times noted that "Indian Harbor ranks among the most influential institutions of its kind in the country."

History
On July 1, 1889, under the leadership of Frank Bowne Jones, Richard Outwater, Henry S. Doremus, Charles J. Hart and others, the Indian Harbor Yacht Club came into being, rising from the ashes of the old Greenwich Yacht Club.  The particular business was originally stated as, "Shall be to encourage and support the sport of yachting, the art of yacht designing and building, and the science of seamanship and navigation." Later, when incorporated, the following words were added: "and to provide for the amusement and recreation of its members."

This was primarily a sailing club and Henry E. Doremus was the first Commodore, William Ross Proctor the Vice Commodore, and Charles J. Hart the Rear Commodore.  The club's first headquarters were in New York, and in 1892 it leased Finch's Island in Greenwich as its sailing base.  The present property was developed in 1895 by Commodore Charles T. Wills, and the clubhouse dates to 1921.  It is an unusual example of Mediterranean Revival design, by architect Henry Pelton, then a member of the club's race committee.

Indian Harbor Yacht Club has recorded more entries in the Newport Bermuda Race than any other yacht club in the world. Indian Harbor members were part of the crew of the Intrepid during its America's Cup victories in 1967 and 1970.

In 1989, as part of the Club's centennial celebrations, Indian Harbor Yacht Club published 'A Century of sailing : the first one hundred years of the Indian Harbor Yacht Club, 1889-1989'   The club's facilities on Steamboat Road were listed on the National Register of Historic Places in 2010.  The designation was in recognition of the club's importance in the realm of racing and yachting, as well as for the architecture of its clubhouse.

The club is a founding member of the National Sailing Hall of Fame.

Notable Members
Thomas Watson Jr.
Dick Nye
Elias Cornelius Benedict
George Lauder (Scottish industrialist)
Edward J. Noble
Clifford D. Mallory

See also
National Register of Historic Places listings in Greenwich, Connecticut

References

External links

 Indian Harbor Yacht Club
 1890s Yacht Photography of J.S. Johnston

 
1889 establishments in Connecticut
Buildings and structures in Greenwich, Connecticut
Clubhouses in Connecticut
Clubhouses on the National Register of Historic Places in Connecticut
National Register of Historic Places in Fairfield County, Connecticut
Sports clubs established in 1889
Sports venues in Fairfield County, Connecticut